Shimanto Union is a union parishad of Jibannagar Upazila, in Chuadanga District, Khulna Division of Bangladesh. There are 15 villages and 11 mouzas in the union.

References

External links
 

Unions of Khulna Division
Unions of Chuadanga District
Unions of Jibannagar Upazila